Aboubakar Sillah (born 25 July 1989) is an Australian football player who currently plays for Persepam Madura United in Indonesia Super League.

References

External links
Aboubakar Sillah at Liga Indonesia

1989 births
Living people
Australian soccer players
Australian expatriate soccer players
Expatriate footballers in Indonesia
Australian expatriate sportspeople in Indonesia
Liga 1 (Indonesia) players
Persepam Madura Utama players
Association football defenders